TOTR may refer to 
TV on the Radio
Thrillville: Off the Rails.